Marcel Hacker (born 29 April 1977, in Magdeburg) is a German rower. He won an Olympic bronze medal in 2000 in Sydney and became a world champion in 2002 in Seville. At the 2016 Summer Olympics in Rio de Janeiro, he competed in men's double sculls with teammate Stephan Krüger. They finished in 8th place.

References

External links
 
 London 2012

Rowers at the 2000 Summer Olympics
Rowers at the 2004 Summer Olympics
Rowers at the 2008 Summer Olympics
Rowers at the 2012 Summer Olympics
Rowers at the 2016 Summer Olympics
Olympic rowers of Germany
Olympic bronze medalists for Germany
1977 births
Sportspeople from Magdeburg
Living people
Olympic medalists in rowing
German male rowers
World Rowing Championships medalists for Germany
Medalists at the 2000 Summer Olympics
European Rowing Championships medalists